Laurence W. Marvin is assistant professor of history in the Evans School of Humanities and Social Sciences at Berry College whose primary scholarly focus is the Albigensian Crusade. He is the author of The Occitan War: A Military and Political History of the Albigensian Crusade, 1209-1218 (Cambridge University Press, 2008).

External links
Berry College personal page
Cambridge University Press, The Occitan War
review of "The Occitan War: A Military and Political History of the Albigensian Crusade" by M.G. Pegg in Speculum (2010), 85: 167-169 
review in Oxford "English Historical Review" (2009) CXXIV (509): 932-934.
 review in "The Journal of Military History" Volume 73, Number 1, January 2009 
 review by David Stewart Bachrach, H-France Review (Society for French Historical Studies) Vol. 11 (July 2011), No. 156 
 interview with Marvin at Medievalists.net 

21st-century American historians
21st-century American male writers
Living people
Year of birth missing (living people)
American male non-fiction writers